Technoparc Montréal is a hightech industrial park in Montréal. The Neomed institute is located in the Technoparc and hosts many small and medium sized pharmaceutical research companies.

History 
The park was established in 1987 as Technoparc Saint-Laurent, renamed Technoparc Montréal in 2008. It includes the Place Innovation building, an Astra Pharma research laboratory, the Neomed Institute, and the Éco-campus Hubert Reeves. In 2015, Green Cross Biotherapeutics, ABB and 4Degrées all announced plans for real estate projects in the park. REM began infrastructure work for a station in the Éco-campus Hubert Reeves in 2016.

Ecology 
Technoparc Montréal is integrated into an ecological reserve known as the Coulée verte du ruisseau Bertrand. The reserve is a habitat for various native animal species, so development must be carefully planned in order to avoid environmental damage. The Éco-campus Hubert Reeves is the center of these attempts to create usable space for clean technology, nanotechnology and sustainable development companies in an environmentally-friendly manner.

Concerns were raised when REM began construction, as the station that was intended to provide public transport for park workers resulted in the destruction of a green heron nesting site according to TechnoparcOiseaux.

Governance 
Technoparc Montréal is a non-profit organization funded largely by an annual contribution of $2.6 million from the city of Montréal. As a publicly funded enterprise, it is subject to strict scrutiny by the government. In 2015 questions were raised concerning the governing board and CEO after Montréal's auditor general released a report citing lack of oversight and conflicts of interest. This resulted in the city disbanding the non-profit organization that had run the park and governing it directly.

See also 
 Parc d'entreprises de la Pointe-Saint-Charles

References 

Industrial parks in Canada
Parks in Montreal
1987 establishments in Quebec